You're Not Built That Way is a 1936 Fleischer Studios animated short film starring Betty Boop and featuring Pudgy the Puppy.

Plot summary
Pudgy the Puppy, out for a stroll, meets a mean bulldog. Impressed by the tough dog, Pudgy imitates his behavior. Betty, seeing this, sings the title song to Pudgy in an attempt to stop this. Pudgy ignores her and follows the bulldog, but his attempts to be tough only land him in trouble. After an attempt to steal a meal from the butcher nearly gets him skewered, Pudgy runs back to Betty, who welcomes him home.

Production notes
The short makes use of Fleischer's multiplane camera to film the backgrounds.

References

External links
 You're Not Built That Way at the Big Cartoon Database.
 You're Not Built That Way on YouTube.
You're Not Built That Way at IMDb.

1936 films
Betty Boop cartoons
1930s American animated films
American black-and-white films
1936 animated films
Paramount Pictures short films
Fleischer Studios short films
Cinecolor films
Short films directed by Dave Fleischer